Birhanu Jula Gelalcha is an Ethiopian field marshal of the Ethiopian National Defense Force. He is currently the Chief of General Staff of Ethiopia since 4 November 2020. He served as the Force Commander of the United Nations Interim Security Force for Abyei (UNISFA) from 2014 to 2016.

Biography 
Of ethnic Oromo descent. Birhanu Jula Gelalcha holds a bachelor's degree from Alpha University College and a master's degree from Greenwich University, both in Addis Ababa. In 2006, Birhanu worked with the UN Mission in Liberia and held the position of Sector Commander. He has also held various other positions with the army including with the Ministry of National Defence, the Cadet School and Brigade Operations. From 2006 to 2009, he was the army's Deputy Commander of the Central Command. In 2010, Birhanu was appointed Commander of the Western Command in the Ethiopian Army.

Birhanu was appointed as Force Commander of UNISFA on 21 November 2014 by United Nations Secretary-General Ban Ki-moon. At the time, he was  a major general. He was promoted to lieutenant general sometime before 9 December 2015. His term ended on 15 January 2016 with the appointment of Major General Hassen Ebrahim Mussa.

On 8 January 2022, Birhanu was promoted to Field marshal (or "Field marshal general", the rank varies among sources) by prime minister Abiy Ahmed and president Sahle-Work Zewde.

References

Ethiopian generals
Ethiopian officials of the United Nations
Living people
1965 births